Zsolnai  or Zsolnay is a Hungarian habitational surname originally used to denote a person from the city Žilina in northwestern Slovakia. It may refer to:

Zsolnai 
 Balázs Zsolnai, Hungarian entomologist
  (1924–2004), Hungarian actress
  (1924–1994), Hungarian footballer
  (born 1949), Hungarian actress
 Richárd Zsolnai (born 1994), Hungarian footballer
 Róbert Zsolnai (born 1982), Hungarian footballer

Zsolnay 
  (1895–1961), Austrian publisher
 Vilmos Zsolnay (1828–1900), Hungarian potter

Hungarian-language surnames
Toponymic surnames